My Father's Face is an album recorded by American guitarist Leo Kottke, released in 1989. It is his second with producer T Bone Burnett.

The same year as the release of My Father's Face Kottke would be featured in a PBS feature, Home and Away.

Track listing 
 "Times Twelve" – 3:32
 "Everybody Lies" – 2:47
 "B. J." – 3:29
 "Why Can't You Fix My Car" – 2:27
 "Theme from Rick and Bob Report" –2:30
 "My Aunt Francis" 4:36
 "William Powell" – 4:57
 "Back in Buffalo" – 3:03
 "Mona Ray" – 2:22
 "Jack Gets Up" – 4:19
 "Doorbell" – 4:59

All songs by Leo Kottke

Personnel 
 Leo Kottke - guitar, vocals
 David Hidalgo - Fender six, eight string, harmony vocals
 Jim Keltner - drums, percussion on "Back in Buffalo" and "The Rick and Bob Report"
 T Bone Burnett - Fender 12, Hammond B-3
 David Miner - four and five string electric bass
 Edgar Meyer - acoustic bass
 Michael Blair - marimba, glockenspiel, Fairchild, tympani, hand drum, shakers, tubular bells, etc.
 Jerry Douglas - dobro
 Charlie Shoemake - vibraphone

Production notes 
 Produced by T Bone Burnett
 Recorded and mixed by Rik Pekkonen
 Assistant engineer: Stacy Baird
 Additional recording by Paul Martinson

References

External links 
 Leo Kottke official site
 Unofficial Leo Kottke web site (fan site)

1989 albums
Leo Kottke albums
Albums produced by T Bone Burnett
Private Music albums